Gbenga Ogedegbe is a Nigerian American physician who is a Professor of Population Health & Medicine at New York University. He serves as Chief of the Division of Health & Behavior and Director of the Center for Healthful Behavior Change in the Department of Population Health at the School of Medicine. His research considers health disparities and evidence-based interventions to improve the health outcomes of minority populations.

Early life and education 
Ogedegbe was born in Lagos. He attended Hussey College Warri. He decided that he wanted to be a physician at the age of eight. After finishing high school, he studied medicine at Donetsk National University in Ukraine. Soon after completing his medical degree he moved to the United States, where he was a medical resident at Montefiore Medical Center. He later joined Columbia University, where he completed a Master's degree in public health. He held research fellowships in both the Weill Cornell Medicine college and Albert Einstein College of Medicine.

Research and career 
Ogedegbe investigates health disparities and the dissemination and implementation of evidence-based medical interventions. He launched his independent career at the Columbia University Vagelos College of Physicians and Surgeons and moved to the NYU Langone Medical Center in 2008. Since 2012 he has served as Director of the Center for Healthful Behavior Change in NYU Langone’s Department of Population Health. In New York City, Ogedegbe led a programme that trained community health workers to support Black communities suffering from hypertension. The health workers provided advice and guidance to faith communities in New York, in which they managed to significantly reduce and manage hypertension. The programme, which involved Therapeutic Lifestyle Changes, was known as FAITH (Faith-Based Approaches in the Treatment of Hypertension). Alongside FAITH, Ogedegbe ran The Barbershop Connection, a programme that identified men who hadn't had colonoscopies and guided them to screenings and follow-up care. He showed that African-American men who were partnered with these patient-navigators were twice as likely to be screened and had a six-point reduction in their blood pressure. Beyond the obvious health benefits, FAITH and the Barbershop Connection creased jobs for local residents.

Alongside FAITH, Ogedegbe created CaRT (the Cardiovascular Research Training Institute), which brings together United States and European researchers in Ghana and Nigeria to train young scientists and increase the number of African healthcare workers. Sub-Saharan Africa accounts for one quarter of the global disease burden, but only 14% of the global health workforce. Ogedegbe has led National Institutes of Health-funded initiatives to eliminate cardiovascular disease in sub-Saharan Africa. Alongside his work on cardiovascular diseases, Ogedegbe runs the National Institutes of Health Stroke Disparities Solutions center.

During the COVID-19 pandemic, Ogedegbe investigated disparities in outcome and disease severity of minority communities who suffered from coronavirus disease. Through an analysis of over 11,000 patients, Ogedegbe found that Black and Hispanic patients were not inherently more susceptible to the disease. In an interview with The New York Times, Ogedegbe explained, “It is all about the exposure. It is all about where people live. It has nothing to do with genes.”

Awards and honors 
 Agency for Healthcare Research and Quality John M. Eisenberg Excellence in Mentorship Award
 Jonathan E. Fanton Leadership in Education award
 Daniel D. Savage Memorial Science Award
 Elected Fellow of the National Academy of Medicine

Selected publications

References 

Donetsk National University alumni
New York University faculty
People from Lagos
Year of birth missing (living people)
Physicians from Lagos
Living people
Members of the National Academy of Medicine
Residents of Lagos